Dodington is a village and civil parish in South Gloucestershire, England.  The village lies in a small, fertile valley between Codrington and Old Sodbury, and runs together with the even tinier hamlet of Coombes End.  It is about 2.5 miles southeast of Chipping Sodbury and four miles from Yate railway station.

The River Frome rises within Dodington Park, the estate that originally formed the economic basis of this small village.  The Cotswold Way also passes through the north end of the village. The River Boyd rises just south of the village.

In addition to the rural area around the village, the parish nowadays encompasses substantial housing areas to the south of Yate and Chipping Sodbury, the latter being the location of Dodington Parish Hall.

Governance
An electoral ward in the same name exists, but only covers housing estates in south Yate. Other northern parts of the parish are in the electoral ward of Chipping Sodbury, while Dodington village and the surrounding rural area are in Westerleigh ward.

History
Numerous Roman remains, including part of a villa have been found in the parish.
Dodington is mentioned in the Domesday Book. The village has grown little since then, having a postbox and a road junction, but no shops and no phone box.

Notable residents
James Dyson, inventor of the Dyson cyclonic separation vacuum cleaner, bought Dodington Park in 2003. Admiral Sir Edward Codrington GCB RN, hero of the Battle of Trafalgar and the Battle of Navarino was born here.

Sport
Dodington football club was formed in 2011 and play in the Bristol & Avon Premier League, which resides at tier 21 of the English Football League. As Dodington has no football pitch facilities, Dodington FC play their home matches outside the parish, in Yate.

References

External links

 GENUKI – Dodington
 Local Focus Events and issues in Chipping Sodbury, Yate and Dodington

Villages in South Gloucestershire District
Civil parishes in Gloucestershire